The 2009–10 United Counties League season was the 103rd in the history of the United Counties League, a football competition in England.

Premier Division

The Premier Division featured 20 clubs which competed in the division last season, along with one new club:
Daventry United, promoted from Division One

League table

Division One

Division One featured 15 clubs which competed in the division last season, along with one new club:
Potton United, relegated from the Premier Division

League table

References

External links
 United Counties League

9
United Counties League seasons